The 2020–21 season of the Norwegian Premier League, the highest bandy league for men in Norway.

Eighteen games were supposed to be played, with 2 points given for wins and 1 for draws. Because of how the COVID-19 pandemic in Norway evolved, the league was stopped in the midst of the 14th round, with the last match having been played 17 January 2021.

After league play could not commence again, for medal purposes the league was reset to the 9th round, when every team had faced each other once. With this setup, Ready won the league ahead of Stabæk and third-placed Solberg. No teams were relegated.

League table before closing

References

Seasons in Norwegian bandy
2020 in bandy
2021 in bandy
Bandy
Bandy
Sports events curtailed due to the COVID-19 pandemic